Mount Northrop is a peak in the Sawtooth Mountains of northeastern Minnesota. It was named for Cyrus Northrop, who was the president of the University of Minnesota from 1884 until 1911.

References

Northrop